The 1974–75 season was the 64th season in Hajduk Split's history and their 29th season in the Yugoslav First League. Their 1st-place finish in the 1973–74 season meant it was their 29th successive season playing in the Yugoslav First League.

Competitions

Overall

Yugoslav First League

Classification

Results summary

Results by round

Matches

First League

Source: hajduk.hr

Yugoslav Cup

Sources: hajduk.hr

European Cup

Source: hajduk.hr

Player seasonal records

Top scorers

Source: Competitive matches

See also
1974–75 Yugoslav First League
1974 Yugoslav Cup

References

External sources
 1974–75 Yugoslav First League at rsssf.com
 1974 Yugoslav Cup at rsssf.com
 1974–75 European Cup at rsssf.com

HNK Hajduk Split seasons
Hajduk Split
Yugoslav football championship-winning seasons